Karlsruher SC is a German football club based in Karlsruhe, Baden-Württemberg.

The following list contains all the footballers that have made over 100 league appearances for the club since the merger of VfB Mühlburg and Karlsruher FC Phönix in 1952.

Players

Notes

References
General
 ksc-stats.de
Specific

Players

Karlsruher SC
Association football player non-biographical articles